Science Park station may refer to:

 Science Park station (MBTA), an elevated light rail station on the MBTA Green Line in Boston, Massachusetts
 Science Park station (MTR), a proposed mass transit station in Pak Shek Kok, New Territories, Hong Kong
 Science Park station (Shenzhen Metro), a metro station on Line 6 of the Shenzhen Metro
 Science Park station (Wuhan Metro), a metro station on Line 5 of the Wuhan Metro